Merenhouse, merenrap or electronic merengue,Mambo o Mambo de Calle is a style of Dominican merengue music formed by blending with dancehall reggae and hip hop.  The mix of Latin music, house music and dancehall started in NYC in the late 1980s.

Merenhouse usually combines a rap style of singing (talk-singing) with actual singing.  It has instruments that are typically in merengue music, such as saxophones, trumpets, accordion, bass, guitar, güira, tambora (drum). However, they can be combined with electronic sounds or even electronic sounds sampled from the actual instruments (much like house music).  Sampling music means to take a sample or portion of a sound recording to reuse it in a song.  Merenhouse is very upbeat and intended for dancing, similar to house music.  It is hard to identify merenhouse based on its time signature and rhythm alone.  Some merenhouse music is in a fast 2/4 beat and has typical merengue style rhythms.  Some also is in a slower 4/4 beat, identifying more with the hip hop style.  Merenhouse can be characterized mostly by the instruments/electronics used and the combination of vocal styles.

History
The hybrid music known as merenrap, merenhouse, or Latin house was formed in the 1980s in New York city. Jorge Oquendo, an entrepreneur, encouraged artists to mix the genres. Lisa M mixed merengue with rap in her second album debuting in 1990. Latin house combines house music, rap, Latin rhythms and Caribbean music.

Dominican merengue music can be considered an expression of Dominican transnationalism, as there was a significant shift in migration of Dominicans to New York City in the twentieth century. As a musical hybrid, merenhouse was popular with a generation of bicultural youth growing up in New York City with Dominican roots that combined both aspects of their culture.  Merenhouse is a symbol of national identity to Dominican Americans.

NYC and Dominicans in the twentieth century
The early 1990s saw a huge increase in immigration to the US from the Dominican Republic due largely to the greatly deteriorating economic situation of the Dominican Republic in the 1980s and early 1990s.  New York City saw the bulk of this initial Dominican population growth, and once those first Dominican immigrates got settled in, New York City became the hub of Dominican culture in the US.  "By 1990, an estimated 900,000 Dominicans—12 percent of the country’s population—lived in New York City alone".  Dominicans also "tend to be more concentrated residing exclusively in barrios or ghettos like Washington Heights-Inwood, home to 59% of Dominicans registered by the INS".  This potent concentration of Dominicans all in one place allowed them to bring in their own culture while they assimilated into the melting pot of cultures found in New York City.  Merengue is one example of the many pieces of Dominican culture brought during this period of immigration, which was a key element to the creation of Merenhouse.

The new style was most importantly influenced by Merengue, the national music and dance of the Dominican Republic. It is in a fast 2/4 beat that has African, Creole, and European origins that emerged during the early 20th Century.  Merengue music has varying styles and a very distinct rhythm.  During its beginnings it included call-and-response vocals, a Spanish guitar, and a box lamellophone called the Congolese marimbula. These instruments were replaced with the acoustic guitar, bass, German accordion, the tambora (a West African two headed drum), and a güira, which is a metal scraper. In the 1930s, Merengue became modernized and became the national symbol of the Dominican Republic. Orchestras played for the middle class and social elite dancehall. The sound became that of a more generic Latin band. This included instrument replacement for the piano, staple percussion and bass.  The merengue in which merenhouse is based upon developed in the 1980s and 1990s, and resulted from Juan Luis Guerra’s incorporation of more modern sounding arrangements and socially relevant themes. He was also influenced by pop and jazz music.

Music influences

Genres that were popular during the 1990s in New York City greatly influenced Dominican Americans to create Merenhouse/Merenrap:

Reggae
Reggae known as "the heartbeat of Jamaica."  Instruments include the snare, bass drums, keyboards, and guitars. When many think of reggae, they first think of the Rastafarian religion, which was created during the 1930s. Many associate Rastas and reggae because of Bob Marley, the Jamaican Icon.

Rap/Hip-Hop
The beginnings of hip hop music/rap can be traced back to the Bronx, NY in the 1960s and 1970s where wall graffiti started to gain popularity with the prevalence of street gangs.  The musical style rap was the result of multiple influences including the Jamaican style of music called "toasting" and several different styles of Deejaying.  DJ styles such as scratching (invented by a DJ named Theodor) and "punch phasing." rap can be defined as a style of music where the lyrics are half spoken, half sung in short phrases accompanied by a musical beat in the background. The term "hip hop" encompasses all of these elements, including rap, DJing, MCing, break dancing and graffiti.

House music
House music is considered a type of electronic dance music which was spawned in Chicago, IL,  and it is heavily influenced by disco. The synthesizer is most commonly associated with electronic dance music and the music is often characterized by its continuous and repetitive beat. This subgenre of electronic dance music was influenced heavily by DJ Knuckles, who moved from playing others' records to making his own music.  There are many subgenres of House music, including "acid house," "Latin house," "jungle," and "techno," as well as many more. This music also has close ties to hip hop.

Influential Artists
 Fulanito is a Dominican-American Merenhouse group based in Washington Heights, Manhattan.  They have received acclaim from being one of the first groups to combine merengue and house music, selling around 2 million albums around the world.
 Proyecto Uno is also a Dominican-American merenhouse group from New York City's East Side, which helped popularize a musical style that blends merengue with rap, techno, dancehall reggae, and hip hop.  The group won Billboard Latin Music Awards, Premios Los Nuestro, and an Emmy Award.
 Ilegales (also called Los Ilegales) is a Grammy-nominated Dominican merenhouse trio.  They reached the Billboard Tropical charts and were nominated for a Latin Grammy award for "Best Pop Album."
 Sandy & Papo, was a duo of merengue and hip hop, with temporary residence in Venezuela. It was made by Sandy Carriello "Sandy MC" and Luis Deschamps "MC Papo", both from the Dominican Republic. The group came to an end when on July 11, 1999, when Luis Deschamps (MC Papo) died in a car accident. Sandy MC continued as a solo and received success with the song "Homenaje a Papo".
 Dark Latin Groove (or DLG) is a salsa band that mixes salsa, reggae, reggaeton, and hip hop.  The group was nominated for the Grammy for "Best Traditional Tropical Album" in 1997 and Premio Los Nuestro award for "Best Tropical Group."
 Lisa M is the first major female Latin rapper. The song "Tu Pum-Pum" in her second album No Lo Derrumbes is the first merenrap song. The album was released in 1990. 
 Los Ficos is a merengue rap band that mixes Merengue, R&B, and hip hop.
 Calle Ciega is the first venezuelan boy band of merengue house.

See also
 Latin rap

References

External links
 Fulanito website
 Proyecto Uno website
 Ilegales website

Dominican Republic music
Merengue music
1990s in Latin music
Dominican styles of music